Bobby Joe Edmonds, Jr. (born September 26, 1964 in Nashville, Tennessee) is a former professional American football running back who played for the Seattle Seahawks, the Los Angeles Raiders, and the Tampa Bay Buccaneers from 1986 to 1989 and 1995. Edmonds played collegiately at the University of Arkansas and was selected by Seattle in the 5th round of the 1986 NFL Draft. Edmonds still holds two Seahawks records, most punt yards gained in a career (1,010 yards) and most punt yards gained in a season (419 yards).  He also made the AFC Pro Bowl squad in 1986 as a rookie.

A 1982 graduate of Lutheran High School North, in St. Louis, Missouri, Edmonds had a successful college career in football as a running back at the University of Arkansas where he returned after his football career to complete a bachelor's degree in broadcasting. After working as an occasional sports writer and color commentator, Edmonds has opened a gallery for fine art. 

Edmonds at one time hosted his own show "The Lunch Special" on the Hog Sports Radio Network in Northwest Arkansas. He has two sons.

References 

1964 births
Living people
American Conference Pro Bowl players
American football running backs
Seattle Seahawks players
Los Angeles Raiders players
Tampa Bay Buccaneers players
Arkansas Razorbacks baseball players
Arkansas Razorbacks football players